Spectamen franciscanum is a species of sea snail, a marine gastropod mollusk in the family Solariellidae.

Description
The size of the shell attains 14 mm.

Distribution
This marine species occurs off Transkei, Rep. South Africa

References

External links
 To World Register of Marine Species
 

franciscanum
Gastropods described in 1963